Walter Clarence "Tillie" Voss (March 28, 1897 – December 14, 1975) was an American football tackle who played nine seasons in the National Football League (NFL). During his time with the Green Bay Packers, Voss, along with Frank Hanny of the Chicago Bears were the first players to be ejected in a game in league history after exchanging punches.

He died in 1975.

NFL Records

Most teams played for : 11

References

External links
 

1897 births
1975 deaths
American football ends
American football tackles
Akron Pros players
Buffalo All-Americans players
Buffalo Bisons (NFL) players
Chicago Bears players
Dayton Triangles players
Detroit Panthers players
Detroit Tigers (NFL) players
Detroit Titans football players
Detroit Mercy Titans men's basketball players
Green Bay Packers players
New York Giants players
Rock Island Independents players
Toledo Maroons players
Players of American football from Detroit
University of Detroit Jesuit High School and Academy alumni
American men's basketball players